"Love's Looking for Me" is a song recorded by Canadian country music group One Horse Blue. It was released in 1993 as the fourth single from their fifth studio album, One Horse Blue. It peaked at number 10 on the RPM Country Tracks chart in February 1994.

Chart performance

References

1993 songs
1993 singles
One Horse Blue songs
Songs written by Sharon Anderson (singer)